The Black Sheep is a 1960 German krimi mystery film directed by Helmut Ashley and starring Heinz Rühmann, Karl Schönböck and Maria Sebaldt. It is loosely based on the Father Brown stories by G. K. Chesterton. Father Brown manages to demonstrate the innocence of a man accused of murder by finding the real culprit. Rühmann reprised the role in He Can't Stop Doing It in 1962.

It was shot at the Bavaria Studios in Munich and on location in Ireland. The film's sets were designed by the art directors Hans Berthel and Robert Stratil.

Cast
 Heinz Rühmann  as Father Brown
 Karl Schönböck  as Theaterdirektor Scarletti
 Maria Sebaldt  as Gloria Scarletti
 Siegfried Lowitz  as Flambeau
 Lina Carstens  as Mrs. Smith
 Fritz Rasp  as Lord Kingsley
 Herbert Tiede  as Inspector Graven
 Friedrich Domin  as Bischof
 Hans Leibelt  as Bankdirektor James Conelly
 Rosel Schäfer  as Mrs. Flambeau
 Gernot Duda  as Barnes

Release and reception
The film was released on December 19, 1960. At the 1961 Deutscher Filmpreis, Das schwarze Schaf received an award in the category of Best Actor.

References

External links

1960 films
1960s mystery films
German mystery films
West German films
1960s German-language films
Films directed by Helmut Ashley
Adaptations of works by G. K. Chesterton
Films based on short fiction
Films about Catholic priests
Films set in Ireland
Films shot in Ireland
Bavaria Film films
Films shot at Bavaria Studios
1960s German films